Extreme Blue is one of IBM's internship program for both graduate and undergraduate students; it also serves as a placement opportunity for future IBM employment due to the significant effort put into placement of the interns.

History 
Extreme Blue was created in 1999 by David Grossman, Jane Harper, Ronald Woan, Sean Martin, Morris Matsa. It began at the Lotus Software site in Cambridge, Massachusetts. In 2003, Extreme Blue participants filed 98 patents.

In 2007, 10,000 applications were received for 92 positions in the U.S.; over 10,000 students applied for 220 positions worldwide.  At the 2008 National Council for Work Experience (NCWE) award ceremony, the UK Extreme Blue program received the "Over 250 Employees – Short term placement" award. In 2009, according to an Extreme Blue manager, over 10,000 applications were received for fewer than 50 US positions.

Since its inception, the program has expanded to include 15 active international locations.

Projects 
Extreme Blue uses IBM engineers, interns, and business managers to develop technology and business plans for new products and services. Each summer an Extreme Blue team also works on a project. These projects mostly involve rapid prototyping of high-profile software and hardware projects. Publicly released projects include the following:
 AmalgamR (2009) amalgamates social information from multiple sources, including Twitter, and displays relevant and timely group-based information.
 BreadCrumbs (2009) is an iPhone application that scans grocery food barcodes and gives consumers information such as ingredients, manufacturing history, and product recall alerts with the use of food traceability servers.
 SMS for Life (2009) fights malaria in Africa by utilizing cell phones, texting and web mapping technology to track and manage antimalarial drugs.
 exSEL (2007) is an end-to-end marketing tool which provides a virtual tour and allows virtual interactions with the exhibits in the IBM Solutions Experience Lab.
 SiSi Say It Sign It (2007) converts from spoken English directly into British Sign Language which is then signed by an animated digital character or avatar.
 Peridot (2004) checks web sites for broken links and assist in updating them. IBM applied for two patents on this technology.
 GameGrid (2003) created a distributed computing MMOG based on the open-source version of ID Software's Quake 2 first-person shooter.

Laboratory locations

North America 
In 2004, there were 44 Extreme Blue teams in North America.
In 2002, there were 101 interns in North America from 42 schools.
  IBM Almaden Research Center located in San Jose, California, USA (2000-current)
 4 teams in 2009
  Cambridge, Massachusetts, USA (1999–2004)
 Debut location of Extreme Blue
 Did not host EB in 2001.
  Raleigh, North Carolina, USA (2002–current)
 Started 2002
 Lab manager:
 (2006-current) Ross Grady
  Austin, Texas, USA (2001-current)
 Started 2001
 Lab manager:
 (2015-current) Marjean Fieldhouse
 Technical lead:
 (2015-current) Matthew Glover
  Montreal, Quebec, Canada
  Ottawa, Ontario, Canada
  Toronto, Ontario, Canada

South America 
  São Paulo, Brazil

Asia 
  Beijing, China
  Bangalore, India (2004–?)
 Started in 2004 with 9 students in 2 teams
  Delhi, India (2010–current)
 Started in 2010 and is currently active.
  IBM Haifa Research Laboratory located in Haifa, Israel

Europe 
  Dublin, Ireland
  Cork, Ireland
  Böblingen, Germany
 3 teams in 2002
  Brussels, Belgium
  Amsterdam, Netherlands
  Uithoorn, Netherlands
  La Gaude, France
  Hursley, United Kingdom
  Zürich, Switzerland
  Rome, Italy

References

External links 
 
 UK Extreme Blue Blog

Internship programs
IBM